This Tiny World is a 1972 Dutch short documentary film about antique mechanical toys, produced by Charles and Martina Huguenot van der Linden. It won an Oscar in 1973 for Documentary Short Subject.

References

External links

1972 films
1970s Dutch-language films
Dutch short documentary films
1972 independent films
Best Documentary Short Subject Academy Award winners
Dutch independent films
1972 documentary films
1972 short films
1970s short documentary films
Films about toys
Antiques
Mechanical toys